In enzymology, a formimidoyltetrahydrofolate cyclodeaminase is an enzyme that catalyzes the chemical reaction

5-formimidoyltetrahydrofolate  5,10-methenyltetrahydrofolate + NH3

Hence, this enzyme has one substrate, 5-formimidoyltetrahydrofolate, and two products, 5,10-methenyltetrahydrofolate and NH3.

This enzyme belongs to the family of lyases, specifically ammonia lyases, which cleave carbon-nitrogen bonds.  The systematic name of this enzyme class is 5-formimidoyltetrahydrofolate ammonia-lyase (cyclizing 5,10-methenyltetrahydrofolate-forming). Other names in common use include formiminotetrahydrofolate cyclodeaminase, and 5-formimidoyltetrahydrofolate ammonia-lyase (cyclizing).  This enzyme participates in folate metabolism by catabolising histidine and adding to the C1-tetrahydrofolate pool.

In mammals, this enzyme can be found as part of a bifunctional enzyme in a single polypeptide with glutamate formimidoyltransferase (EC 2.1.2.5), the enzyme activity that catalyses the previous step in the histidine catabolic pathway. This arrangement allows the 5-formimidoyltetrahydrofolate intermediate to move directly from one active site to another without being released into solution, in a process called substrate channeling.

Structural studies

References

EC 4.3.1
Enzymes of known structure